Žiga Jelar (born 22 October 1997) is a Slovenian ski jumper.

World Cup

Standings

Individual wins

Individual starts

References

External links

1997 births
Living people
Sportspeople from Kranj
Slovenian male ski jumpers
21st-century Slovenian people
FIS Nordic World Ski Championships medalists in ski jumping